The Strahlhorn (3,200 m) is a mountain of the Bernese Alps, located north of Baltschieder in the canton of Valais. It lies between the Baltschiedertal and the Gredetschtal, east of the Bietschhorn.

References

External links
Strahlhorn on Hikr

Mountains of the Alps
Alpine three-thousanders
Bernese Alps